The Banco Caboverdiano de Negócios (Portuguese meaning "Capeverdean Business Bank") is a Cape Verdean commercial bank. Its headquarters are at Avenida Amílcar Cabral, in the city centre of Praia. The current president of its board of directors is Luís Vasconcelos Lopes.

History
The company was founded in 2003 as Banco Totta de Cabo Verde (BTCV) — a local subsidiary of the Portuguese Banco Totta & Açores acquired by Banco Santander in 2000. In October 2004 BTCV was acquired by the Cape Verdean company Sociedade para o Estudo e Promoção do Investimento, and in February 2005 its name was changed to the current Banco Caboverdiano de Negócios.

In 2017 IMPAR acquired the majority of BCN shares.

See also
List of companies in Cape Verde

References

Banks of Cape Verde
Companies based in Praia
1996 establishments in Cape Verde